Bertrand Hémonic (born 23 November 1979 in Pontivy) is a French sprint canoer and marathon canoeist who has competed since the late 2000s.

Career 
He won a bronze medal in the C-1 4 x 200 m event at the 2009 ICF Canoe Sprint World Championships in Dartmouth. Hemonic also competed at the 2008 Summer Olympics, but was eliminated in the semifinals of both the C-2 500 m and the C-2 1000 m events.

References

Canoe09.ca profile
Sports-reference.com profile

1979 births
Living people
People from Pontivy
Canoeists at the 2008 Summer Olympics
French male canoeists
Olympic canoeists of France
ICF Canoe Sprint World Championships medalists in Canadian
Sportspeople from Morbihan